Red Solstice 2: Survivors is a real-time tactical video game developed by Ironward Games and published by 505 Games. It was released on 17 June 2021 for the PC platform. It is a direct sequel to the 2015 game The Red Solstice.

Gameplay
The game is described as a tactical shooter from an isometric perspective in cramped corridors. It features 15 main missions and over 20 side missions.

References

External links
Official website

2021 video games
Survival video games
Strategy video games
Multiplayer and single-player video games
Video games developed in Croatia
Windows games
Windows-only games
Top-down video games
505 Games games